Maximus or Maximos (died 6 December 1305) was a metropolitan bishop of the Metropolis of Kiev and all Rus' in the Ecumenical Patriarchate of Constantinople. He was consecrated in Constantinople and reigned from 1283 to 1305. Maximos was of Greek origin. 

At that time, the Rus' princes were vassals of the Golden Horde. Khan Tokhta wanted to eliminate the princes' semi-independence. To that effect, he had sent his brother Tudan to the Rus' lands in 1293. Tudan's army devastated fourteen towns. Tokhta himself (also known as Tokhta-Temur) went to Tver and forced Dmitry of Pereslavl (also known as Dmitry Alexandrovich), who was allied to Nogai Khan, to abdicate. Russian chroniclers depicted these events as "The harsh-time of Batu returns.". Some sources suggest that Tokhta and Nogai, who was effectively the co-emperor, had worked together. 

Maximos was known for his ecclesiastic trips to the Golden Horde and for mediating between the quarreling princes of the north-eastern Rus' (e.g. Dmitry of Pereslav and Andrey of Gorodets, the sons of Alexander Nevsky). Following that, Patriarch Athanasius I of Constantinople established the Metropolis of Halych in 1303 with its see in Halych in the Kingdom of Galicia–Volhynia.

In 1301, Maximos attended a patriarchal council in Constantinople. He supported the Prince of Tver and Vladimir Mikhail Yaroslavich in his struggle with Prince of Moscow Yuri Danilovich for the title of Grand Duke.

He was canonised a saint in the Russian Orthodox Church, and his feast day is celebrated on December 6 (December 19, N.S.).

References

External links
St Maximus, Metropolitan of Kiev Orthodox Synaxarion
Icon of the Mother of God of St Maximus

13th-century births
1305 deaths

13th-century Greek people
14th-century Greek people
Metropolitans of Kiev and all Rus' (988–1441)
Greek saints of the Eastern Orthodox Church
Year of birth unknown